The United States Post Office - Nampa Main, also known as the Herbert A. Littleton Postal Station, in Nampa, Idaho, is a two-story Neoclassical building completed in 1931. James A. Wetmore was the supervising architect. The building was added to the National Register of Historic Places in 1989.

History
In 1922 the Nampa Post Office rented facilities at the First National Bank, and a permanent post office was constructed next to the bank in 1930 by Boise contractor J.O. Jordan & Sons. The building was completed June 21, 1931.

An arsonist caused fire damage to the building in 1973.

The building was named in 2009 for Nampa resident Herbert A. Littleton, a Medal of Honor recipient who died in the Korean War.

References

External links

		

National Register of Historic Places in Canyon County, Idaho
Neoclassical architecture in Idaho
Government buildings completed in 1931
Nampa, Idaho